The Perijá thistletail (Asthenes perijana) is a species of bird in the family Furnariidae. It is endemic to the Perijá Mountains in Colombia and Venezuela.

Its natural habitats are subtropical or tropical high-altitude shrubland and subtropical or tropical high-altitude grassland. It is threatened by habitat loss. Some efforts have been made to help the species by the Colombian government.

References

External links
BirdLife Species Factsheet.

Perijá thistletail
Birds of the Serranía del Perijá
Perijá thistletail
Taxonomy articles created by Polbot